Symmoca mimetica is a moth of the family Autostichidae. It is found in Spain.

References

Moths described in 2008
Symmoca